is a UK labour law case regarding the National Minimum Wage Act 1998.

Facts
Workers were staying at home overnight, and would answer telephone queries. In between they could read or watch television. The employers argued that r 15(1) draws a distinction between work at home and work at an employer’s workplace, so when the worker was not working at home he should not be paid.

Judgment
Buxton LJ held the workers were "working" even when on call, because ‘the alternative that is apparently contended for by the appellant, that the employees are only working when they are actually dealing with phone calls with all the periods spent waiting for calls excluded, would, in my view effectively make a mockery of the whole system of the minimum wage.’ Buxton LJ's judgment read as follows.

Peter Gibson LJ and Neuberger J agreed.

See also

UK labour law

Notes

United Kingdom labour case law
United Kingdom wages case law
Court of Appeal (England and Wales) cases
2002 in case law
2002 in British law